The Bombay International was a professional invitational snooker tournament. The winners of the two editions were John Spencer and John Virgo respectively.

History 
This was the first snooker tournament to be held in both India and Asia. In its first year it featured six players in round-robin, with John Spencer winning the most matches and topping the table to collect the £2,000 prize. In its second year, eight players competed, with the addition of a knockout stage. John Virgo collected the £3,000 winners cheque, defeating Cliff Thorburn 
13–7 in the final.

Winners

References

Snooker non-ranking competitions
Snooker competitions in India
Recurring sporting events established in 1979
Recurring events disestablished in 1980
1979 establishments in India
1980 disestablishments in India
Sport in Mumbai
Defunct snooker competitions
Defunct sports competitions in India